Feore is a surname. Notable people with the surname include:

 Anna Feore (born 1996), Canadian volleyball player
 Colm Feore (born 1958), American-Canadian actor
 Donna Feore (born 1963), Canadian choreographer and theatre director